Michael Hübner (born 8 April 1959 in Chemnitz) is a German former professional sprint track cyclist, who became world champion in sprint, Keirin and team sprint.

External links 

German male cyclists
UCI Track Cycling World Champions (men)
1959 births
Living people
Sportspeople from Chemnitz
German track cyclists
East German male cyclists
Cyclists from Saxony
People from Bezirk Karl-Marx-Stadt